Channel 60 refers to several television stations:

Canada
The following television stations operate on virtual channel 60 in Canada:
 CFMT-DT-2 in Ottawa, Ontario

See also
 Channel 60 virtual TV stations in the United States

60